Sergey Aleksandrovich Poltoratsky (born ) is a retired Soviet heavyweight weightlifter. He won a world title in 1977, placing second in 1974 and 1975, and set two ratified world records, in 1970 and 1980. He competed at the 1976 Summer Olympics, but failed to complete the snatch event.

References

1947 births
Living people
Sportspeople from Khmelnytskyi, Ukraine
Ukrainian male weightlifters
Soviet male weightlifters
World Weightlifting Championships medalists
Olympic weightlifters of the Soviet Union
Weightlifters at the 1976 Summer Olympics